Jane's ATF: Advanced Tactical Fighters is a 1996 combat flight simulator developed and published by Electronic Arts for DOS. It is part of the Jane's Combat Simulations franchise. An expansion pack, NATO Fighters, was released in 1996. A compilation package, Advanced Tactical Fighters Gold, was released in 1997 for Microsoft Windows.

Reception

In Computer Gaming World, Denny Atkin praised the game and its features, but complained for lacking multiplayer mode. Steve Wartofsky called ATF an "evolutionary rather than revolutionary step" for Jane's Combat Simulations, but argued that it set the standard for its genre. While he found its graphics to be a "mixed bag", he enjoyed the game overall, and highlighted its encyclopedia as its best feature.

Writing for PC Gamer US, Dan Bennett called ATF as a solid, good-looking sim, but found the game to be overly difficult.

Next Generation reviewed the PC version of the game positively and recommended it for flight sim fans.

In 1996, the editors of Computer Gaming World nominated ATF for their "Simulation of the Year" award, which ultimately went to EF2000. They wrote that ATF "makes up for its aging engine by providing the best multiplayer environment of any modern sim". It was also a nominee for the Computer Game Developers Conference's 1996 "Best Simulation Game" Spotlight Award, but lost the prize to MechWarrior 2: Mercenaries.

The expansion, NATO Fighters, received 7.8 out of 10 from T. Liam McDonald of GameSpot who called it "[...] a must, as it expands considerably on the original program and doubles its play life."

References

1996 video games
Combat flight simulators
DOS games
Electronic Arts games
Jane's Combat Simulations
Multiplayer and single-player video games
Video games with expansion packs
Windows games
Video games developed in the United States